Claughton is a civil parish in the Wyre district of Lancashire, England.  It contains 35 buildings that are recorded in the National Heritage List for England as designated listed buildings.  Of these, one is at Grade II*, the middle grade, and the others are at Grade II, the lowest grade.  The parish is a scatted rural area, and most of the listed buildings are farmhouses, farm buildings, houses and cottages, and associated structures.  The Lancaster Canal and the River Brock pass through the parish; four bridges crossing the canal and two crossing the river are listed.  The other listed buildings are medieval crosses, a church, a milestone, and a public house.


Key

Buildings

Notes and references

Notes

Citations

Sources

Lists of listed buildings in Lancashire
Buildings and structures in the Borough of Wyre